Chandrasekhar Rath was an Indian Odia litterateur. In 2018, he was nominated for Padma Shri but could not receive it due to death.

Early life and education
Rath was from Malpada village in Balangir district.
He did his graduation from Rajendra college. He did Post-graduation in English from Canning College, University of Lucknow.

Career
Rath joined the Odisha Education Service in 1952 as lecturer in English and also served as Secretary of Test Book Bureau before retiring as Deputy Director Public Instruction (DPI) in 1987.
He has written 14 short story collections, 15 essay books, devotional essays and three novels.

Novels
Yantrarudha (The Instrumented) in 1967
Asurya Upanivesh (The Sunless Colony) in 1974
Nav Jatak (Regenesis) in 1981.

Awards
Padma Shri
Sahitya Akademi Award in 1997
Hutch Crossword Book Award
Kendra Sahitya Akademi Award
Odisha Sahitya Akademi Award
Atibadi Jagannath Das Samman

Death
Rath died on 9 February 2018 at the age of 89. He was survived by his wife, three daughters and a son.

References

20th-century births
2018 deaths
Recipients of the Sahitya Akademi Award in Odia
Recipients of the Padma Shri in literature & education
Recipients of the Atibadi Jagannath Das Award
Recipients of the Odisha Sahitya Akademi Award
People from Balangir district
Writers from Odisha
Odia-language writers
Odia novelists
Novelists from Odisha
University of Lucknow alumni